İlter is a Turkish given name and surname, that may be derived from 7th-century Turkic leader Ilterish Qaghan. The name may refer to:

Given name 
Ilter Tashkin (born 1994), Azerbaijani football player
İlter Turan (born 1941), Turkish political scientist
İlter Türkmen (1927–2022), Turkish diplomat and politician

Surname 
Aydın İlter, Turkish general
Balçiçek İlter (born 1973), Turkish journalist

See also
Ilterish Qaghan

Turkish masculine given names